Anthony Samuel is a Cook Island former professional rugby league footballer who played in the 1990s and 2000s.

Playing career
Between 2000 and 2002 Samuel played for Workington Town in the Northern Ford Premiership.

He made an appearance for Workington Town in a 2010 testimonial match for Neil Frazer along with other former favourites such as Hitro Okesene.

Representative career
Samuel won three caps for Cook Islands in the 2000 Rugby League World Cup.

Note
Anthony Samuel's surname is occasionally misspelt with a trailing "s" as Samuels.

References

External links
» Legends Evening 90's
Statistics at rugby.widnes.tv

Cook Island rugby league players
Cook Islands national rugby league team players
Expatriate sportspeople in England
Living people
Place of birth missing (living people)
Rugby league locks
Rugby league second-rows
Widnes Vikings players
Workington Town players
Year of birth missing (living people)